John Roth is an American Republican politician from Michigan. He was elected to the Michigan House of Representatives from the 104th district in 2020.

Political career 
Roth held the district for the Republicans in 2020.

References 

Living people
Republican Party members of the Michigan House of Representatives
21st-century American politicians
Year of birth missing (living people)